Parrhasius selika is a butterfly of the family Lycaenidae. It was described by William Chapman Hewitson in 1874. It is found in Brazil, Bolivia and Venezuela.

References

Butterflies described in 1874
Eumaeini
Lycaenidae of South America
Taxa named by William Chapman Hewitson